Yang Yang (born January 21, 1997) is a Chinese swimmer. He won 4 gold medals at the 2012 Summer Paralympics.

References

Paralympic swimmers of China
Swimmers at the 2012 Summer Paralympics
Swimmers at the 2016 Summer Paralympics
Paralympic gold medalists for China
Living people
World record holders in paralympic swimming
1997 births
Medalists at the 2012 Summer Paralympics
Medalists at the World Para Swimming Championships
Paralympic medalists in swimming
Chinese male freestyle swimmers
S2-classified Paralympic swimmers
21st-century Chinese people